Maryamin, also spelled Mreimin, may refer to:

 Maryamin, Afrin, village in northern Aleppo Governorate, Syria
 Maryamin, Homs, village in Homs Governorate, Syria
 Mariamme, Homs, ancient city and bishopric in Homs Governorate, Syria
 Maryamin, Idlib, village in Idlib Governorate, Syria
 Maryamin, Jabal Seman, village in southern Aleppo Governorate, Syria